The 2012 Albirex Niigata season is Albirex Niigata's 9th consecutive season in J.League Division 1. It also includes the 2012 J.League Cup, and the 2012 Emperor's Cup.

Match results

Pre-season

J.League

League table

Results summary

Results by round

J.League Cup

Emperor's Cup

Players

First team squad

Pre-season transfers 

In:

Out:

References

External links 
 2012 schedule – Albirex Niigata 

Albirex Niigata
Albirex Niigata seasons